The 118th Regiment Indiana Infantry was an infantry regiment from Indiana that served in the Union Army during the American Civil War. The regiment was mustered into Federal service in July and August 1863 to serve for six months. It served in the Knoxville campaign in East Tennessee, fighting in actions at Blue Springs and Walker's Ford in 1863. The regiment was mustered out at the beginning of March 1864 having lost 3 men dead from enemy action and 87 men dead from disease.

History
Organized at Wabash, Ind., July and August, 1863, for 6 months' service. Left State for Nicholasville, Ky., September 16. Attached to Mahan's 1st Brigade, Wilcox's Left Wing Forces, Dept. of the Ohio, to October, 1863. 2nd Brigade, Wilcox's Left Wing Forces, Dept. of the Ohio, to January, 1864. District of the Clinch, Dept. of the Ohio, to March, 1864.

March from Nicholasville, Ky., to Cumberland Gap September 24-October 3, and to Morristown October 6-8. Action at Blue Springs October 10. March to Greenville and duty there until November 6. March across Clinch Mountain to Clinch River. Action at Walker's Ford, Clinch River, December 2. Duty at Tazewell, Maynardsville and Cumberland Gap until February, 1864. Action at Tazewell January 24. Mustered out March 1-4, 1864.

Regiment lost during service 3 Enlisted men killed and mortally wounded and 1 Officer and 86 Enlisted men by disease. Total 90.

See also

 List of Indiana Civil War regiments
 Indiana in the Civil War

References

Attribution
 

Military units and formations established in 1863
Military units and formations disestablished in 1864
1864 disestablishments in the United States
Units and formations of the Union Army from Indiana
1863 establishments in Indiana